Pantyffynnon is a small village in Carmarthenshire, Wales, half a mile south-west of Ammanford, and a mile east of Tycroes. It lies between the rivers Loughor and Amman at the foot of Mynydd y Betws.

The village is served by Pantyffynnon railway station on the Heart of Wales Line.

External links
 Pantyffynnon Communities First

Villages in Carmarthenshire